Standard Industries is a privately-held global industrial company headquartered in New York City. Standard is the parent company of a number of industrial manufacturers, roofing and solar companies, and related real estate and investment platforms. David Millstone and David Winter are co-CEOs of the company.

Standard's operating companies include GAF, GAF Energy, W. R. Grace and Company, BMI Group, Siplast, Schiedel, and Speciality Granules (SGI), along with Standard Investments and Winter Properties.

History

Standard Industries' origins date back to 1886, with the founding of the Standard Paint Company.

In January 2016, Standard purchased the Danish company Icopal for about €1 billion. In December of the same year, the company acquired the German Braas Monier Building Group for €1.1 billion.

In January 2019, Standard launched  GAF Energy, a solar company which aims to increase the installations of residential solar roofs by working with regional installers.

On April 26, 2021, W. R. Grace announced that they have entered into a definitive agreement with Standard Industries Holdings Inc. where Standard Industries Holdings will acquire Grace in an all-cash transaction valued at approximately $7 billion.

Operations
Standard Industries is led by co-CEOs David Millstone and David Winter. The company has more than 20,000 employees in over 80 countries.

Operating companies
GAF is the largest roofing company in North America which focuses on the manufacturing of roofing materials. Its projects include the Library of Congress and the Alamo.

BMI is a manufacturer of building materials and roofing accessories. It was formed in 2016 in the merger of Brass Monier and Icopal. BMI’s projects include the Louvre, the Maria Taferl, and the Lego House in Denmark.

Siplast is a manufacturer of roofing and waterproofing systems. Siplast's projects include the United Nations headquarters, the Library of Congress, the Metropolitan Museum of Art, the Washington DC Metro system, and the Jacob Javits Center.

GAF Energy is a manufacturer of residential solar roofs. The company currently offers its solar product in nine states, including Massachusetts, Rhode Island, Connecticut, New York, New Jersey, Pennsylvania, Illinois, Florida, and California.

Schiedel is a designer and manufacturer of chimney, stove, and ventilation systems in Europe.

Specialty Granules (SGI) is a North American aggregates and mining company.

In September 2021, Standard announced the $7 billion acquisition of W. R. Grace & Co., an American specialty chemicals business headquartered in Columbia, Maryland.

Related businesses

Standard Investments
Standard’s related investment business, Standard Investments, is a fundamentally-based investment platform that takes concentrated long-term positions across a range of sectors and leverages industrial knowledge to create value for all stakeholders. It is active in public equities, real estate, and venture capital.

In July 2020, Standard Investments' venture capital firm (formerly 40 North Ventures) acquired investments in eleven of GE Ventures’ startups in industrial and technological sectors.

Winter Properties
Winter Properties is a related business of Standard Industries that owns multiple properties in New York City and nationally. Winter Properties’ holdings are a mix of commercial and residential properties.

References

External links
 

Privately held companies based in New York City
Building materials companies of the United States